Paul Kane (born 1973 in Chesterfield, Derbyshire, England) began his professional writing career in 1996, providing articles and reviews for news-stand  publications, and started producing dark fantasy and science fiction stories in 1998.

Life
Paul has a B.A. and M.A. from Sheffield Hallam University and in the past has worked as a photographer, an artist, an illustrator/cartoonist and a professional proofreader. He has also worked as  a lecturer in Art and Creative Writing at Chesterfield College in the UK and  served as Special Publications Editor for the British Fantasy Society, where he has edited publications featuring authors such as Clive Barker, Neil Gaiman, Brian Aldiss and Muriel Gray.

His latest writing projects include film work, a graphic adaptation of his Torturer story with artist Ian Simmons, an entry in the Cinema Macabre book introduced by Jonathan Ross and featuring Simon Pegg, Mark Gatiss and Jeremy Dyson, and a book examining the Hellraiser movies, introduced by Doug "Pinhead" Bradley: The Hellraiser Films and Their Legacy.

His Shadow Writer site was launched on Halloween 2001.

He is married to author and editor Marie O'Regan.

Bibliography
He is the author of the books :
 Alone (In the Dark)
 Touching the Flame 
 FunnyBones
 Signs of Life
 The Hellraiser Films and Their Legacy
 Hellbound Hearts (edited by Marie O'Regan) (2010)
 The Lazarus Condition
 Dalton Quayle Rides Out
 The Afterblight Chronicles: Arrowhead (Abaddon Books, September 2008)
 Sherlock Holmes and the Servants of Hell (Solaris Books, 2016)
 100 Ways to Write a Book - 100 authors in conversation with Alex Pearl about their backgrounds, motivations and working methods (Bolzwinick Books, 2022)

See also
 List of horror fiction writers

References

External links
Net worth
Interview with Paul Kane
Shadow Writer
Paul Kane Myspace Page
The Hellraiser Films And Their Legacy Myspace Page
Story behind Ghosts - Online Essay by Paul Kane

1973 births
Living people
English writers
People from Chesterfield, Derbyshire
Alumni of Sheffield Hallam University
English male writers